Blagoje Jovović (1922 – 2 June 1999) was a Montenegrin Serb hotel owner, and participant of World War II in Yugoslavia initially as a member of the Partisan and later the Chetnik movement. He is credited with mortally wounding Croatian Ustaše leader Ante Pavelić in Argentina.

Biography
Jovović was born in Kosić near Danilovgrad in today's Montenegro. During World War II, he initially fought for the Yugoslav Partisans and then the Chetniks, as a member of the Bjelopavlić Chetnik brigade. At the time when World War II started, he was serving in Strumica, near the Yugoslav border with Greece. When war broke out, Jovović reportedly came back to his birthplace, Kosić in Bjelopavlići. In July 1941, he took part in an antifascist uprising against Italy and later participated in the battle of Pljevlja as a member of the Partisans. He later switched allegiances and fought for the Chetniks, under the command of Bajo Stanišić. In September 1944, he was part of the delegation led by Dušan Vlahović and Jakov Jovović, that was sent from Kotor across the Adriatic Sea to Taranto to negotiate with the British. There they were informed about the Allied change of support in favor of Partisans as a result of the Tehran Conference and they stayed in Italy until the remainder of the war. Jovović spent his time in Italy in several refugee camps. For a brief period, he worked in the Secret Intelligence Service of Britain. On one such occasion, he met Randolph Churchill, of whom he reportedly did not hold a very high opinion. In 1948, Jovović emigrated to Argentina with the help of Jakov Jovović, a naval officer of the Kingdom of Yugoslavia.

Attempted assassination of Ante Pavelić
In Argentina, Jovović was known as the founder of the Serbian Orthodox community “Saint Sava”, and one of the founders of the Organisation of Fighters “Draža Mihailović” as well as the member of the Board of the “Njegoš” association. While living in Argentina and running a successful hotel enterprise that he owned, he received tips about Pavelić's whereabouts in Argentina. In the assassination attempt, Jovović received assistance from several people including Jakov Jovović and Milo Krivokapić, an associate of Blagoje.

The assassination was scheduled to take place on 9 April 1957, on the eve of the Independent State of Croatia's anniversary celebration, but they decided to delay the attack by a day. On 10 April at 21:00, 16 years after the founding of the Independent State of Croatia, Pavelić suspected someone was following him as he walked down a street, so he turned back and fired several shots towards Jovović, who started running after Pavelić and fired five shots, two of which hit Pavelić who then, according to Jovović, staggered, bent and begged for mercy. There are however, differing versions of how the attempted assassination unfolded.

Jovović described the assassination attempt in the following excerpt from the book Two Bullets for Pavelić („Два метка за Павелића”) by Tihomir-Tiho Burzanović:

Pavelić required hospitalization following the attempt. As he recovered, the government of Argentina reached an agreement with Yugoslavia to extradite Pavelić. As a result, he fled to Chile before landing in Francisco Franco's Spain. He died on 28 December 1959 in Madrid, Spain from complications as a result of the wounds.

By Jovović's own account, he acted on his own, independent of the Yugoslav or any other secret services. Most Croat émigrés believed that the Yugoslav state was behind the assassination attempt. Jovović stated that he wanted to kill Pavelić in order to "avenge Serbian victims" from the "greatest butcher of Serbs".

Final years and legacy

In 1999, Jovović visited Yugoslavia for the first time since he left and visited Ostrog, where he met Metropolitan Amfilohije. It was there that he first publicly confessed that he was the person responsible for the attempted assassination of Ante Pavelić. Jovović died on 2 June 1999 in Rosario, Argentina.

Memorials 

In 2020, a street in Belgrade was renamed after Blagoje Jovović. A memorial plaque was also installed.

References

1922 births
1999 deaths
People from Danilovgrad
Serbs of Montenegro
Yugoslav assassins
Yugoslav emigrants to Argentina
Date of birth unknown
Argentine people of Montenegrin descent